The Department of Industries is a key government department that oversees industrial activity in the Indian state of Kerala. The DOI is a senior cabinet department led by a senior minister and team of 15 secretaries. The administrative head of the Industries & Commerce Department is the Principal Secretary (Industries & Commerce). The Directorate of Industries & Commerce Department is located at Vikas Bhavan, Thiruvananthapuram, is headed by the Director (Industries & Commerce). This is the functional arm of the department implementing various industrial activities of the departments. District Industries Centers are located in all district headquarters.

Objectives

 Convert Kerala into a favoured destination for Manufacturing, Agro Processing, Health Services, and Knowledge based Industries and Services
 Strengthen the State Level Public Enterprises (SLPEs) by technological upgradation, diversification, efficient management system and synergizing with Central Public Sector Undertakings
 Make Traditional Industries competitive by modernization, value addition and skill development
 Promote and support SMSEs as an ancillary to large scale industries as well as a self-sustaining entity considering its role as a largest employment provider in the State
 Make use of the abundant and highly rich mineral resources of the State to the fullest extent protecting environment and ecology and restricting the mining activity in the Public Sector
 Generate massive employment in industrial, commercial and service sectors
 Attract huge capital investment on mutually beneficial terms
 Tap the rich industrial potential of biotechnology
 Accelerate growth in Service Sector and to make Kerala a major Commercial Hub
 Develop Kerala as a global centre of excellence with state-of-the-art education and skill sets and prepare a pool of multi skilled, technically competent individuals and organizations

Organization structure

The Industries & Commerce Department is headed by the Hon'ble Minister (Industries, Commerce, Law & Coir). The administrative headed of the Industries & Commerce Department is the Principal Secretary (Industries & NORKA).

Line departments 
 Kerala State Industrial Development Corporation (KSIDC)
 Kerala Industrial Infrastructure Development Corporation (KINFRA)
 Kerala Bureau of Industrial Promotion (K-BIP)
 Directorate of Industries and Commerce (DI&C)
 Directorate of Handloom and Textiles
 Public Sector Restructuring and Internal Audit Board (RIAB)
 Khadi and Village Industries Board (KVIB)
 Directorate of Public Sector Undertakings
 Directorate of Coir Development Department

External links
 Official Website of the Industries Department, Kerala
 Official website of Govt. of Kerala

Government departments of Kerala
Economy of Kerala
State industries departments of India